The Annis Mound and Village site (15BT2, 15BT20, and 15BT21) is a prehistoric Middle Mississippian culture archaeological site located on the bank of the Green River in Butler County, Kentucky, several miles northwest of Morgantown in the Big Bend region. It was occupied from about 800 CE to about 1300 CE.

It was surrounded by the village area (15 BT 20) which was situated north of the generally east to west course of the Green River at the sites location. The village featured domestic structures and several sequential iterations of an encircling defensive palisade of upright tree trunks. The palisade was built three different times in the site's history; each one larger than its predecessor and encircling an expanded village area. A bastion was discovered in the northwest corner of the last version of the palisade. Agriculture was based on the cultivation of maize as a staple of the diet. Ceramics found at the site were typical Mississippian culture pottery; although a few sherds of high status pottery from the Cahokia site were discovered during excavations of the platform mound summit structure.

This feature lies directly north of the village area and outside of the area encompassed by the palisade.

A  area at the site was listed on the National Register of Historic Places as "Annis Mound and Village Site" in 1985.

See also
Angel Mounds
Carlston Annis Shell Mound
Kincaid Mounds State Historic Site
List of Mississippian sites

References

External links

Middle Mississippian culture
Archaic period in North America
Mounds in Kentucky
Native American history of Kentucky
Archaeological sites in Kentucky
Former populated places in Kentucky
Geography of Butler County, Kentucky
National Register of Historic Places in Butler County, Kentucky
Archaeological sites on the National Register of Historic Places in Kentucky